The South African Railways Class MB 2-6-6-0 of 1910 was a steam locomotive from the pre-Union era in the Colony of Natal.

In November 1910, the Natal Government Railways placed five  Mallet articulated compound steam locomotives in service. In 1912, when they were assimilated into the South African Railways, they were renumbered and designated .

Manufacturer
Following on the satisfactory performance of the experimental Mallet compound steam locomotive which had been acquired by the Natal Government Railways (NGR) in 1909, a further five similar locomotives were ordered from the American Locomotive Company (ALCO) in 1910. They were delivered in November of that year and numbered in the range from 337 to 341.

Characteristics
Like the previous Mallet locomotive, these five had Walschaerts valve gear, bar frames and used saturated steam. They differed little from the previous Mallet, basically only in respect of their larger boilers which made them slightly heavier and their tenders with a  larger coal capacity.

In a compound locomotive, steam is expanded in phases. After being expanded in a high-pressure cylinder and having then lost pressure and given up part of its heat, it is exhausted into a larger-volume low-pressure cylinder for secondary expansion, after which it is exhausted through the smokebox.

In the compound Mallet locomotive, the rear set of coupled wheels are driven by the smaller high-pressure cylinders which are fed steam from the steam dome. Their spent steam is then fed to the larger low-pressure cylinders which drive the front set of coupled wheels. By comparison, in the more usual arrangement of simple expansion, steam is expanded just once in any one cylinder before being exhausted through the smokebox.

Service
These five locomotives joined the first Mallet in banking service, working heavy coal trains between Estcourt and Highlands on the Natal mainline. To relieve coupler strain, they were used in three-locomotive trains and, in this manner, were able to haul  up the one in thirty (3⅓%) gradients on that line.

South African Railways

When the Union of South Africa was established on 31 May 1910, the three Colonial government railways (Cape Government Railways, NGR and Central South African Railways) were united under a single administration to control and administer the railways, ports and harbours of the Union.

Although the South African Railways and Harbours came into existence in 1910, with Sir William Hoy appointed as its first General Manager, the actual classification and renumbering of all the rolling stock of the three constituent railways were only implemented with effect from 1 January 1912.

In 1912, these five locomotives were renumbered in the range from 1602 to 1606 and designated  on the South African Railways. They had a relatively short service life and were withdrawn from service by 1924. Their early demise was probably brought forward considerably by the appearance of the Garratt locomotive type on Cape Gauge in 1921.

References

2210
2-6-6-0 locomotives
(1C)C locomotives
ALCO locomotives
Cape gauge railway locomotives
Railway locomotives introduced in 1910
1910 in South Africa
Scrapped locomotives